Quack, The Quack or Quacks may refer to:

People 
 Quack Davis, American baseball player
 Hendrick Peter Godfried Quack (1834–1917), Dutch economist and historian
 Joachim Friedrich Quack (born 1966), German Egyptologist
 Johannes Quack (born 1959), German ethnologist
 Martin Quack (born 1948), German physical chemist
 Niels Quack (born 1980), Swiss and German engineer
 Sigrid Quack (born 1958), German social scientist

Film 
 Quacks (TV series), a British comedy series about quackery
 The Quack, a 1982 Polish drama film
 Znachor (1937 film), a Polish drama film
 O. K. Quack, a character in the Scrooge McDuck universe
 Quack, a duck in Peep and the Big Wide World, a children's TV series

Music 
 Quack (album), an album by the American-Canadian group Duck Sauce
 The Quack (EP), a 2013 album by Australian electronic music project What So Not

Sport 
 Quack (horse) (1969–1995), an American Thoroughbred racehorse
 The Quack (horse), a 19th-century Australian Thoroughbred racehorse

Games 
 The Quacks of Quedlinburg, a bag-building, push-your-luck board game, affectionately known as "Quacks" for short, designed by Wolfgang Warsch.
 Quack, a portmanteau of queen and jack; see Glossary of contract bridge terms § Q

Other uses 
 Quack (medicine), a person who practices quackery, the promotion of unproven or fraudulent medical practices
 Quack (sound), onomatopoeia for the sound made by ducks
 Quack grass (Elymus repens), a species of grass
 Quack.com, a company based in Silicon Valley